634 Ute is a minor planet orbiting the sun.

References

External links
 
 

Background asteroids
Ute
Ute
X-type asteroids (SMASS)
19070512